Yuriy Avanesov (16 August 1935 – 19 August 2012) is a former professional Soviet footballer and coach.

References

External links
 

1935 births
2012 deaths
Footballers from Baku
Azerbaijani footballers
Soviet footballers
Soviet football managers
Ukrainian football managers
FC Volyn Lutsk managers
FC Podillya Khmelnytskyi managers
FC Spartak Ivano-Frankivsk managers
FC Nyva Vinnytsia managers
Association footballers not categorized by position